KFRP may refer to:

 KFRP (FM), a defunct radio station (90.7 FM) formerly licensed to Coalinga, California, United States
 Koobi Fora Research Project, an archaeological project centered on the Koobi Fora Ridge near Lake Turkana in Kenya
 Kinesiology Federation Registered Professional